Football was contested for men only at the 1966 Central American and Caribbean Games in San Juan, Puerto Rico.

The gold medal was won by Netherlands Antilles for the third time, who earned 10 points

Table 
A 2 point system used.

Results

Statistics

Goalscorers

References

External links
 

1966 Central American and Caribbean Games
1966
1966